Lita is the third solo studio album by the American glam metal singer and guitarist Lita Ford. Originally released in February 1988, it was her first for RCA Records and her first published with the supervision of new manager Sharon Osbourne. Musicians Don Nossov and Myron Grombacher, who were best known for being the rhythm section of the successful American singer Pat Benatar, joined Ford for the recording sessions while Charles Dalba and Tommy Caradonna played drums and bass during the promotional tour.

The album is Ford's most successful, reaching No. 29 on the US Billboard 200 chart and being certified platinum. It produced the hit singles  "Close My Eyes Forever" (a duet with Ozzy Osbourne) and "Kiss Me Deadly" which peaked at numbers 8 and 12 respectively on the Billboard Hot 100 chart. "Kiss Me Deadly" was named the 76th best hard rock song of all time by VH1.

Track listing

Personnel
Band members
Lita Ford – guitar, vocals
David Ezrin – keyboards
Don Nossov – bass guitar
Myron Grombacher – drums

Additional musicians
Craig Krampf – additional percussion and drums
Ozzy Osbourne – duet vocals on "Close My Eyes Forever"
Llory McDonald, Mike Chapman– background vocals

Production
Mike Chapman – producer
George Tutko – engineer, mixing at Village Recorders and One on One Recording Studios, Los Angeles
Brett Swain, Charlie Brocco, Jimmy Hoyson, Toby Wright – assistant engineers
George Marino – mastering at Sterling Sound, New York
Ria Lewerke - art direction
Moshe Brakha - photography

Charts

Certifications

References 

1988 albums
Lita Ford albums
Albums produced by Mike Chapman
RCA Records albums